Monmouth Executive Airport  is a privately owned, public use airport in Monmouth County, New Jersey. It is in Wall Township six miles west of Belmar (which its codes are derived from), east of Farmingdale. The National Plan of Integrated Airport Systems for 2011–2015 categorized it as a general aviation reliever airport. Prior to 2003, it was known as Allaire Airport. The airport was sold on December 3, 2013 to a consortium known as Wall Aviation. The new owners intend to evict current renters and upgrade the facility to serve corporate clients.

In an analysis by the Regional Plan Association in 2011, Monmouth Executive scored highly as a potential airport for airline flights to expand capacity and relieve aviation congestion in the New York area.

Facilities
Monmouth Executive Airport covers 850 acres (344 ha) at an elevation of 153 feet (47 m). It has two asphalt runways: 14/32 is 7,371 by 85 feet (2,247 x 26 m) and 3/21 is 3,512 by 50 feet (1,070 x 15 m).

In the year ending January 1, 2010 the airport had 57,229 aircraft operations, average 156 per day: 83% general aviation and 17% air taxi.

Incidents and accidents
On February 15, 2010 a small aircraft, identified as a Cessna 337, crashed on approach to the airport, killing all five people on board. The NTSB accident report indicated that the pilot made an abrupt maneuver while exceeding the operating limitations of the aircraft which caused a structural failure of the right wing.

See also 
 List of airports in New Jersey
 Aviation in the New York metropolitan area

References

External links 

 

Airports in New Jersey
Transportation buildings and structures in Monmouth County, New Jersey
Wall Township, New Jersey